Antibody-drug conjugates or ADCs are a class of biopharmaceutical drugs designed as a targeted therapy for treating cancer. Unlike chemotherapy, ADCs are intended to target and kill tumor cells while sparing healthy cells. As of 2019, some 56 pharmaceutical companies were developing ADCs.

ADCs are complex molecules composed of an antibody linked to a biologically active cytotoxic (anticancer) payload or drug. Antibody-drug conjugates are an example of bioconjugates and immunoconjugates.

ADCs combine the targeting properties of monoclonal antibodies with the cancer-killing capabilities of cytotoxic drugs, designed to discriminate between healthy and diseased tissue.

Mechanism of action
An anticancer drug is coupled to an antibody that targets a specific tumor antigen (or protein) that, ideally, is only found in or on tumor cells. Antibodies attach themselves to the antigens on the surface of cancerous cells. The biochemical reaction that occurs upon attaching triggers a signal in the tumor cell, which then absorbs, or internalizes, the antibody together with the linked cytotoxin. After the ADC is internalized, the cytotoxin kills the cancer. Their targeting ability was believed to limit side effects for cancer patients and give a wider therapeutic window than other chemotherapeutic agents, although this promise hasn’t yet been realized in the clinic. 

ADC technologies have been featured in many publications, including scientific journals.

History
The idea of drugs that would target tumor cells and ignore others was conceived in 1900 by German Nobel laureate Paul Ehrlich; he described the drugs as a "magic bullet" due to their targeting properties.

In 2001 Pfizer/Wyeth's drug Gemtuzumab ozogamicin (trade name: Mylotarg) was approved based on a study with a surrogate endpoint, through the accelerated approval process. In June 2010, after evidence accumulated showing no evidence of benefit and significant toxicity, the U.S. Food and Drug Administration (FDA) forced the company to withdraw it. It was reintroduced into the US market in 2017.

Brentuximab vedotin (trade name: Adcetris, marketed by Seattle Genetics and Millennium/Takeda) was approved for relapsed HL and relapsed systemic anaplastic large-cell lymphoma (sALCL)) by the FDA on August 19, 2011 and received conditional marketing authorization from the European Medicines Agency in October 2012.

Trastuzumab emtansine (ado-trastuzumab emtansine or  T-DM1, trade name: Kadcyla, marketed by Genentech and Roche) was approved in February 2013 for the treatment of people with HER2-positive metastatic breast cancer (mBC) who had received prior treatment with trastuzumab and a taxane chemotherapy.

The European Commission approved Inotuzumab ozogamicin as a monotherapy for the treatment of adults with relapsed or refractory CD22-positive B-cell precursor acute lymphoblastic leukemia (ALL) on June 30, 2017 under the trade name Besponsa® (Pfizer/Wyeth), followed on August 17, 2017 by the FDA.

The first immunology antibody-drug conjugate (iADC), ABBV-3373, showed an improvement in disease activity in a Phase 2a study of patients with rheumatoid arthritis and a study with the second iADC, ABBV-154 to evaluate adverse events and change in disease activity in participants treated with subcutaneous injection of ABBV-154 is ongoing.

In July 2018, Daiichi Sankyo Company, Limited and Glycotope GmbH have inked a pact regarding the combination of Glycotope's investigational tumor-associated TA-MUC1 antibody gatipotuzumab and Daiichi Sankyo's proprietary ADC technology for developing gatipotuzumab antibody drug conjugate.

In 2019 AstraZeneca agreed to pay up to US$6.9 billion to jointly develop DS-8201 with Japan's Daiichi Sankyo. It is intended to replace Herceptin for treating breast cancer. DS8201 carries eight payloads, compared to the usual four.

Commercial products
Twelve ADCs have received market approval by the FDA – all for oncotherapies.

Components of an ADC
An antibody-drug conjugate consists of 3 components:
Antibody - targets the ADC and may also elicit a therapeutic response.
Payload - elicits the desired therapeutic response.
Linker - attaches the payload to the antibody and should be stable in circulation only releasing the payload at the desired target. Multiple approaches to conjugation have been developed for attachment to the antibody and reviewed. DAR is the drug to antibody ratio and indicates the level of loading of the payload on the ADC.

Payloads
Many of the payloads for oncology ADCs (oADC) are natural product based  with some making covalent interactions with their target. Payloads include the microtubulin inhibitors monomethyl auristatin A MMAE,  monomethyl auristatin F MMAF  and mertansine, DNA binder calicheamicin  and topoisomerase 1 inhibitors SN-38 and exatecan resulting in a renaissance for natural product total synthesis. Glucocorticoid Receptor Modulators (GRM) represent to most active payload class for iADCs. Approaches releasing marketed GRM molecules like dexamethasone and budesonide have been developed. Modified GRM molecules have also been developed that enable the attachment of the linker with the term ADCidified describing the medicinal chemistry process of payload optimization to facilitate linker attachment. Alternatives to small molecule payloads have also been investigated, for example, siRNA.

Linkers
A stable link between the antibody and cytotoxic (anti-cancer) agent is a crucial aspect of an ADC.  A stable ADC linker ensures that less of the cytotoxic payload falls off before reaching a tumor cell, improving safety, and limiting dosages.

Linkers are based on chemical motifs including disulfides, hydrazones or peptides (cleavable), or thioethers (noncleavable).  Cleavable and noncleavable linkers were proved to be safe in preclinical and clinical trials. Brentuximab vedotin includes an enzyme-sensitive cleavable linker that delivers the antimicrotubule agent monomethyl auristatin E or MMAE, a synthetic antineoplastic agent, to human-specific CD30-positive malignant cells. MMAE inhibits cell division by blocking the polymerization of tubulin. Because of its high toxicity MMAE cannot be used as a single-agent chemotherapeutic drug. However, MMAE linked to an anti-CD30 monoclonal antibody (cAC10, a cell membrane protein of the tumor necrosis factor or TNF receptor) was stable in extracellular fluid. It is cleavable by cathepsin and safe for therapy. Trastuzumab emtansine is a combination of the microtubule-formation inhibitor mertansine (DM-1) and antibody trastuzumab that employs a stable, non-cleavable linker.

The availability of better and more stable linkers has changed the function of the chemical bond. The type of linker, cleavable or noncleavable, lends specific properties to the cytotoxic drug. For example, a non-cleavable linker keeps the drug within the cell. As a result, the entire antibody, linker and cytotoxic (anti-cancer) agent enter the targeted cancer cell where the antibody is degraded into an amino acid. The resulting complex – amino acid, linker and cytotoxic agent – is considered to be the active drug. In contrast, cleavable linkers are detached by enzymes in the cancer cell. The cytotoxic payload can then escape from the targeted cell and, in a process called "bystander killing", attack neighboring cells.

Another type of cleavable linker, currently in development, adds an extra molecule between the cytotoxin and the cleavage site. This allows researchers to create ADCs with more flexibility without changing cleavage kinetics. Researchers are developing a new method of peptide cleavage based on Edman degradation, a method of sequencing amino acids in a peptide. Also under development are site-specific conjugation (TDCs) and novel conjugation techniques to further improve stability and therapeutic index, α emitting immunoconjugates, antibody-conjugated nanoparticles and antibody-oligonucleotide conjugates.

Anything Drug Conjugates
As the antibody-drug conjugate field has matured, a more accurate definition of ADC is now Anything-Drug Conjugate. Alternatives for the antibody targeting component now include multiple smaller antibody fragments like diabodies, Fab, scFV, and bicyclic peptides.

Research

Non-natural amino acids
The first generation uses linking technologies that conjugate drugs non-selectively to cysteine or lysine residues in the antibody, resulting in a heterogeneous mixture. This approach leads to suboptimal safety and efficacy and complicates optimization of the biological, physical and pharmacological properties. Site-specific incorporation of unnatural amino acids generates a site for controlled and stable attachment. This enables the production of homogeneous ADCs with the antibody precisely linked to the drug and controlled ratios of antibody to drug, allowing the selection of a best-in-class ADC. An Escherichia coli-based open cell-free synthesis (OCFS) allows the synthesis of proteins containing site-specifically incorporated non-natural amino acids and has been optimized for predictable high-yield protein synthesis and folding. The absence of a cell wall allows the addition of non-natural factors to the system to manipulate transcription, translation and folding to provide precise protein expression modulation.

Other disease areas
The majority of ADCs under development or in clinical trials are for oncological and hematological indications. This is primarily driven by the inventory of monoclonal antibodies, which target various types of cancer. However, some developers are looking to expand the application to other important disease areas.

See also 

 Antibody-oligonucleotide conjugate
 Immune stimulating antibody conjugate
 Small molecule drug conjugate

References 

Antineoplastic drugs
Biotechnology
Chemotherapeutic adjuvants
 
Immunology